Illuminated may refer to:

 "Illuminated" (song), by Hurts
 Illuminated Film Company, a British animation house
 Illuminated, alternative title of Black Sheep (Nat & Alex Wolff album)
 Illuminated manuscript

See also
 Illuminate (disambiguation)
 Illumination (disambiguation)
 Illuminations (disambiguation)
 Illuminator (disambiguation)